Edward is an English male given name. It is derived from the Anglo-Saxon name Ēadweard, composed of the elements ēad "wealth, fortune; prosperous" and weard "guardian, protector”.

History
The name Edward was very popular in Anglo-Saxon England, but the rule of the Norman and Plantagenet dynasties had effectively ended its use amongst the upper classes. The popularity of the name was revived when Henry III named his firstborn son, the future Edward I, as part of his efforts to promote a cult around Edward the Confessor, for whom Henry had a deep admiration.

Variant forms

The name has been adopted in the Iberian peninsula since the 15th century, due to Edward, King of Portugal, whose mother was English. The Spanish/Portuguese forms of the name are Eduardo and Duarte. Other variant forms include French Édouard, Italian Edoardo and Odoardo, German, Dutch, Czech and Romanian Eduard and Scandinavian Edvard.

Short forms include   Ed, Eddy, Eddie, Ted, Teddy and Ned

People called Edward

Medieval 

 Edward the Elder (c. 874–924), the son of Alfred the Great
 Edward the Martyr (c. 962–978), English king and Christian martyr
 Edward the Confessor (c. 1003–1066), English King; patron saint of England until 1348
 Edward I of England (1239–1307), called Longshanks; conqueror of Wales
 Edward Balliol (c. 1283–1367), pretender to the Scottish throne during the reign of David II
 Edward II of England (1284–1327), deposed in January 1327, probably murdered
 Edward III of England (1312–1377), English king
 Edward, the Black Prince (1330–1376), eldest son of King Edward III
 Edward, Duke of Guelders (1336–1371) 
 Edward IV of England (1442–1483), older brother of Richard III, father of Edward V
 Edward V of England (1470–c. 1483), one of the princes in the Tower

Modern

Royalty and nobility
 Edward VI of England (1537–1553), the son of Henry VIII and Jane Seymour
 Edward, Count Palatine of Simmern (1625–1663), Count Palatine
 Prince Edward, Duke of York and Albany (1739–1767), brother of George III
 Lord Edward FitzGerald (1763–1798), Irish aristocrat and revolutionary
 Prince Edward, Duke of Kent and Strathearn (1767–1820), the son of George III, father of Queen Victoria
 Prince Edward of Saxe-Weimar (1823–1902), son of Prince Bernhard of Saxe-Weimar-Eisenach
 Princess Edward of Saxe-Weimar (1827–1904), wife of Prince Edward of Saxe-Weimar
 Edward VII of the United Kingdom (1841–1910), the son of Queen Victoria
 Lord Edward Cecil (1867–1918), son of the 3rd Marquess of Salisbury
 Edward VIII of the United Kingdom (1894–1972), the son of George V, abdicated
 Prince Edward, Duke of Kent (born 1935), grandson of George V
 Prince Edward, Earl of Wessex and Forfar (born 1964), the son of Queen Elizabeth II
 Lady Edward Manners (born 1975), wife of Lord Edward Manners and daughter-in-law of the 10th Duke of Rutland
 Edward Windsor, Lord Downpatrick (born 1988), the grandson of The Duke of Kent

Politicians
 Edward Dickinson Baker (1811–1861) was an American politician, lawyer, and military leader, close friend of Abraham Lincoln
 Edward Dembowski (1822–1846), Polish leftist, philosopher and columnist
 Edward Gierek (1913–2001), First Secretary of Polish United Workers Party from 1970 to 1980
 Edward Heath (1916–2005), former Prime Minister of the United Kingdom
 Edward Jayetileke, Chief Justice of Sri Lanka from 1950 to 1952
 Edward Stanley Kellogg (1870–1948), 16th Governor of American Samoa, former United States senator
 Edward "Ted" M. Kennedy (1932–2009), American politician, lawyer, and senator, Kennedy family member
 Edward M. Kennedy Jr. (born 1961), American politician and lawyer, son of Ted Kennedy
 Ed Miliband (born 1969), British politician, former leader of the Labour Party
 Ed Murray (born 1955), Democratic politician and former Mayor of Seattle
 Edward Nothnagle (1866–1938), Pennsylvania State Representative
 Edward Alexander Nugawela (1898–1972), Sri Lankan Sinhala politician and army major
 Edward L. Romero, entrepreneur and American diplomat who served as the U.S. Ambassador to Spain and Andorra between 1998 and 2001
 Edward Stettinius, Jr. (1900–1949), United States Secretary of State
 Edward L. Stokes (1880–1964), U.S. Congressman from Pennsylvania
 Edward Maria Wingfield (1550–1631), English colonist and soldier
 Edward Youde (1924–1986), 26th Governor of Hong Kong

Artists and intellectuals
 Edward Asare (born 1993), Ghanaian blogger, influencer, and digital marketer
 Edward Barker (1950–1997), English cartoonist who signed his drawings simply as Edward
 Edward Blishen (1920–1996), English author
 Ed Byrne (neuroscientist) (born 1952), British neuroscientist and university administrator
 Edward Duyker (born 1955), Australian historian
 Edward Elgar (1857–1934), English composer
 Edward Gamble (born 1986), English comedian
 Edward Gibbons, English choirmaster and composer
 Edward Gorey (1925–2000), American illustrator
 Edward Gould (1988–2012), English animator and creator of Eddsworld
 Edward Grimes, one of the two members of Irish pop duo Jedward
 Edward Hopper (1882–1967), American realist painter
 Edward Jayakody (born 1952), Sri Lankan Sinhala musician and composer
 Edward Killy, American filmmaker
 Edward Daniel Leahy, Irish painter
 Edward MacDowell (1860–1908), American composer and pianist
 Edward Norton (born 1969), American actor
 Edward Platt, (1916–1974), American actor
 Edward G. Robinson, (1893–1973), Romanian-American actor
 Edward John David "Eddie" Redmayne (born 1982), English actor
 Edward Said (1935–2003), Palestinian-American academic
 Ed Sheeran, English singer-songwriter and musician
 Edward van de Vendel, Dutch author of children's literature
 Edward "Eddie" Van Halen (1955–2020), Dutch-American musician
 Eddie Vedder, American singer, musician, songwriter
 Edward W. Hardy (born 1992), American composer, musician, and producer

Sports

 Edward Scott Bozek (1950–2022), American Olympic épée fencer
 Edward Fatu (1973–2009), American professional wrestler better known as Umaga, member of Anoa'i family
 Ed Gainey (Canadian football), American player of Canadian football
 Eddie Guerrero (1967–2005), American professional wrestler
 Ed Hochuli (born 1950), NFL official
 Ed Hodgkiss (born 1970), American football coach
 Edward Lawrence Levy, English world champion weightlifter
 Ed Mieszkowski (1925–2004), American football player
 Ed Orgeron (born 1961), American football coach
 Edward Pratt, British long-distance unicyclist
 Edward Weitz (born 1946), Israeli Olympic weightlifter

Other people
 Edward H. White II (1930–1967) American astronaut
 Edward Allaway (born 1939), American mass murderer who perpetrated the 1976 California State University, Fullerton, massacre
 Edward Rohan Amerasekera (1916–1974), first indigenous Commander of the Sri Lanka Air Force
 Edward Harold Bell (1939–2019), American sex offender and murderer
 Edward Brown (born 1942), American involved in a tax dispute with the U.S. government
 Edward Douglas (bishop) (1901–1967), Scottish Roman Catholic
 Edward Edwards (disambiguation), several people
 Edward F. Fritsch (born 1950), American scientist
 Edward "Ed" Gein (1906–1984), American murderer and suspected serial killer
 Edward Lagrone (1957–2004), American serial killer and rapist
 Edward Kmiec (1936–2020), American Catholic bishop
 Edward Baker Lincoln (1846–1850), second son of Abraham Lincoln
 Edward Mosberg (1926–2022), Polish-American Holocaust survivor, educator, and philanthropist
 Edward McSweegan, American microbiologist
 Edward Playfair, British businessman
 Edward Porta (born 1954), Argentinian former textile trader 
 Edward Snowden (born 1983), American who disclosed National Security Agency secrets
 Edward Smith (disambiguation), several people

People surnamed Edward
 John Edward, professional name of John Edward McGee, Jr. (born 1969), American self-proclaimed psychic
 Trevelyan Edward (1938–1995), Sri Lankan cricketer

Fictional characters
 Ed, Edd n Eddy, television show, as well as main characters thereof
 Edward, fictional platypus from Camp Lazlo
 Edward, in Fire Emblem: Radiant Dawn
 Edward AKA: DEATH, a main character and assassin from the Anita Blake: Vampire Hunter series
 Edward Bear, mock "formal" name for a teddy bear—another name for Winnie-the-Pooh
 Edward the Blue Engine, from Thomas the Tank Engine and Friends
 Eddie Brock, a character from Marvel Comics; the best known incarnation of Venom
 Edward Bunnigus, in the webcomic Schlock Mercenary
 Edward Cullen, the vampire love-interest in the fantasy/romance novels of Stephenie Meyer's Twilight Series
 Edward Elric, the protagonist in the anime/manga series, Fullmetal Alchemist
 Edward Ferrars, in Sense and Sensibility by Jane Austen
 Edward Gardner, in the 1997 French-American fantasy drama movie FairyTale: A True Story
 Edward 'Ted' Hasting, from British TV series Line of Duty
 Edward Elizabeth Hitler, a character from British TV series Bottom
 Edward Hyde, the title character's evil alter ego in Dr Jekyll and Mr Hyde by Robert Louis Stevenson
 Edward James Kenway, a character from the Assassin's Creed video game franchise, appearing as the protagonist of Assassin's Creed IV: Black Flag
 Edward Mars, the shipwrecked marshal in American TV series Lost
 Edward "Whitebeard" Newgate, the captain of the Whitebeard Pirates in the One Piece manga series
 Edward Nigma, aka The Riddler, a supervillain from DC Comics
 Edward Richtofen, a sociopathic German scientist from Call of Duty: World at War; appears in the Nazi Zombies mode as well as in Call of Duty: Black Ops and Call of Duty: Black Ops II
 Edward Fairfax Rochester, the love interest of Jane in Jane Eyre
 Edward Scissorhands, title character of the eponymous film
 Edward "Stubbs" Stubblefield, the fictional undead from the Stubbs the Zombie in Rebel Without a Pulse video game
 Edward "Blackbeard" Teach, fictionalized versions of the historical figure of the same name from various media
 Edward Wong Hau Pepelu Tivrusky IV, from the anime Cowboy Bebop
 Edward Chris von Muir, "spoony bard" from Final Fantasy IV
 Ed Norton, a character played by Art Carney in American sitcom The Honeymooners
 Mister Ed, the talking horse, from the television series of the same name
 Edward the Butler, played by Lachlan Walker in the web-series Corner Shop Show
 Edward Trunk, an elephant from the Rupert Bear franchise.

See also

 Edwards (surname)

References

English-language masculine given names
English masculine given names
Old English given names